John Smith (Burke) de Burgh, 11th Earl of Clanricarde  (11 November 1720 – 21 April 1782), styled Lord Dunkellin until 1726, was an Irish peer.

Career

The Honourable John Smith Burke was born to Michael Burke, 10th Earl of Clanricarde and his wife Anne Smith in 1720. He was the couple's fourth and last child, and the heir to the earldom, having two older sisters. 

An older brother had died in infancy. He succeeded his father on the latter's death in 1726, at the age of six. 

Lord Clanricarde was educated at Winchester College. He was elected a Fellow of the Royal Society and a Fellow of the Society of Antiquaries in 1753. He was a Privy Counsellor of Ireland for eight days in 1761, being struck off the list of the Council on 16 July. He died in April 1782 at Portumna Castle, County Galway and was buried in the Dominican friary, Athenry.

Family
In 1740, he married Hester Amelia Vincent, daughter of Sir Henry Vincent, 6th Baronet of Stoke d'Abernon. By Royal Licence on 13 May 1752, he and his uncles assumed the surname de Burgh which had been the family's surname in previous centuries: de Burgh was gaelicised in Irish as de Búrca which over the centuries became Búrc then Burke.

The couple had four children:
 Lady Hester Amelia de Burgh, who married William Trenchard
 Lady Margaret Augusta de Burgh, wife of Luke Dillon (d.1825) of Hall Place, Warnford, Hampshire. The couple's funeral hatchment survives in the Church of Our Lady, Warnford.
 Henry de Burgh, 1st Marquess of Clanricarde
 General John Thomas de Burgh, 13th Earl of Clanricarde.

Honours and arms
PC (Ire): Privy Counsellor, 1761

Arms

References

Further reading

 Portumna Castle and its Lords, Michael Mac Mahon, 1983.
 Burke:People and Places, Eamon Bourke, Dublin, 1995.
 From Warlords to Landlords:Political and Social Change in Galway 1540–1640, Bernadette Cunningham, in "Galway:History and Society", 1996.

1720 births
1782 deaths
People from County Galway
Fellows of the Royal Society
John Smith
Members of the Irish House of Lords
Earls of Clanricarde